Gerrit Smith (March 6, 1797 – December 28, 1874), also spelled Gerritt Smith, was a leading American social reformer, abolitionist, businessman, public intellectual, and philanthropist. Married to Ann Carroll Fitzhugh, Smith was a candidate for President of the United States in 1848, 1856, and 1860, but only won the election to a single term, 1853–1854, in the House of Representatives.

Valedictorian of his class at the new Hamilton College, he had "a fine mind", with "a strong literary bent and a marked gift for public speaking". He was called "the sage of Peterboro." He was well liked, even by his political enemies. The many who appeared at his house in Peterboro, invited or not, were well received.

Smith, the richest man in New York State and one of the wealthiest in the country, was committed to political reform. Above all, the elimination of slavery; so many fugitive slaves came to Peterboro to ask for his help (usually, in reaching Canada) that there is a book about them. Peterboro was, because of him; the capital of the abolition movement; the only assembly of escaped slaves (as opposed to free Blacks) ever to meet in the United States—the Fugitive Slave Convention of 1850—took place in neighboring Cazenovia because Peterboro was too small for the meeting.

Smith was also, and less successfully, a temperance activist, and a women's rights suffrage advocate. He was a significant financial contributor to the Liberty Party and the Republican Party throughout his life. Besides making substantial donations of both land and money to create Timbuctoo, an African-American community in North Elba, New York, he was involved in the temperance movement and the colonization movement, before abandoning colonization in favor of abolitionism, the immediate freeing of all the slaves. He was a member of the Secret Six who financially supported John Brown's raid at Harpers Ferry, in 1859. Brown's farm, in North Elba, was on land he bought from Smith.

Early life

Forebears
Smith was born in Utica, New York, when it was still an unincorporated village, to Peter Gerrit Smith (1768–1837), whose ancestors were from Holland (Gerrit is a Dutch name), and Elizabeth (Livingston) Smith, daughter of Col. James Livingston and Elizabeth (Simpson) Livingston. Peter was a slave owner and the largest landholder in New York State. "In partnership with John Jacob Astor in the fur trade and alone in real estate, Peter Smith [had] managed to amass a considerable fortune. Peter was the county judge of Madison County, New York, and has been described as 'easily its leading citizen'." He was "a devout and emotionally religious man[...]. From 1822 on, Peter Smith was intensely engaged in the work of the Bible and Tract societies."

The author of the only book on Peter calls him greedy, self-centered, driven by the search for profits, and someone who did not like people who were not like him: white, male, and Dutch.

He turned over a $400,000 business [] to his son Gerrit in 1819 and bequeathed $800,000 more [] to his children in 1837. Gerrit also inherited  of land from his father, and at one point he owned , an area bigger than Rhode Island. An 1846 listing of lands he is offering for sale fills 45 pages.

Smith's maternal aunt, Margaret Livingston, was married to Judge Daniel Cady. Their daughter Elizabeth Cady Stanton, a founder and leader of the women's suffrage movement, was Smith's first cousin. Elizabeth Cady met her future husband, Henry Stanton, also an active abolitionist, at the Smith family home in Peterboro, New York. Established in 1795, the town had been founded by and named for Gerrit Smith's father, Peter Smith, who built the family homestead there in 1804. Gerrit came there when he was 9.

Gerrit as a young man

Gerrit was described as "tall, magnificently built and magnificently proportioned, his large head superbly set on his shoulders;" he "might have served as a model for a Greek god in the days when man deified beauty and worshipped it." He attended Hamilton Oneida Academy in Clinton, Oneida County, New York, and graduated with honors from its successor Hamilton College in 1818, giving the valedictory address, and describing his stay at the college as "very active with many friends". In January 1819, he married Wealtha Ann Backus (1800–1819), daughter of Hamilton College's first President, Azel Backus D.D. (1765–1817), and sister of Frederick F. Backus (1794–1858). Wealtha died in August of the same year. In 1822, he married Ann Carroll Fitzhugh (1805–1879), sister of Henry Fitzhugh (1801–1866); their relationship "appeared to be loving". They had eight children, but only Elizabeth Smith Miller (1822–1911), mother of his grandson Gerrit Smith Miller, and Greene Smith (c. 1841–1880) survived to adulthood.

In the year of his graduation, the death of his mother plunged his father, Peter, into severe depression. He withdrew from all business and vested in his second son Gerrit, who had to abandon plans for a law career, the entire charge of his estate, described as "monumental".

He became an active temperance campaigner, and claimed to have given in 1824 the first temperance speech ever in the New York State Legislature. In his hometown of Peterboro, he built one of the first temperance hotels in the country, which was not successful commercially, and was disliked by many locals.

Smith wrote of himself:

Gerrit in the 1830s
He attended numerous revival meetings, and taught Sunday school. He thought of establishing a seminary for Black students. In 1834 he began a Peterboro Manual Labor School for Black students, along the model of nearby Oneida Institute. It had only one instructor, and it lasted only one year. Previously a supporter of the American Colonization Society, he became an abolitionist in 1835 after a mob in Utica, including New York congressman and future Attorney General Samuel Beardsley, broke up the initial meeting of the New York Anti-Slavery Society, which he attended at the urging of his friends Beriah Green and Alvan Stewart. At his invitation, the meeting continued the next day in Peterboro. He resigned as a trustee of Hamilton College "on the grounds that the school was insufficiently anti-slavery", and joined the board of and financially assisted the Oneida Institute, "a hotbed of anti-slavery activity". He contributed $9,000 to support schools in Liberia, but realized by 1835 that the American Colonization Society had no intention of abolishing slavery.

Smith was a laggard instead of a leader in changing from supporting colonization to "immediatism",
immediate full abolitionism. Support for Jefferson Davis after the war would have been unthinkable for Garrison, Douglass, or other abolitionist leaders.

Political career
"It must be admitted that few men in this country have been a candidate for high office so many times and polled so few votes."

In 1840, Smith played a leading part in the organization of the Liberty Party; the name of the party was his. In the same year, their presidential candidate James G. Birney married Elizabeth Potts Fitzhugh, Smith's sister-in-law. Smith and Birney travelled to London that year to attend the World Anti-Slavery Convention in London.

Birney, but not Smith, is recorded in the commemorative painting of the event. In 1848, Smith was nominated for the Presidency by the remnant of this organization that had not been absorbed by the Free Soil Party. An "Industrial Congress" at Philadelphia also nominated him for the presidency in 1848, and the "Land Reformers" in 1856. In 1840 and again in 1858, he ran for Governor of New York on an anti-slavery platform.

On June 2, 1848, in Rochester, New York, Smith was nominated as the Liberty Party's presidential candidate. At the National Liberty Convention, held June 14–15 in Buffalo, New York, Smith gave a major address, including in his speech a demand for "universal suffrage in its broadest sense, females as well as males being entitled to vote." The delegates approved a passage in their address to the people of the United States addressing votes for women: "Neither here, nor in any other part of the world, is the right of suffrage allowed to extend beyond one of the sexes. This universal exclusion of woman...argues, conclusively, that, not as yet, is there one nation so far emerged from barbarism, and so far practically Christian, as to permit woman to rise up to the one level of the human family." Reverend Charles C. Foote was nominated as his running mate. The ticket would come in fourth place in the election, carrying 2,545 popular votes, all from New York.

At the request of friends, Smith had 3,000 copies printed of an 1851 speech in Troy in which he set forth his views of government. Smith laments the people's universal dependence on government. As a consequence of that dependence, government occupies itself "for the most part, in doing that it belongs to the people to do". He opposed tariffs, internal improvements, such as the Erie Canal, at public expense, and publicly-supported schools, which could not teach religion, which Smith thought the main function of schools. The remedy was less government, and the less, the better.

The only political office to which Smith was ever elected, and that by a very large majority, was Representative in the U.S. Congress. Smith served a single term in Congress, on the Free Soil ticket, from March 4, 1853, until the end of the session on August 7, 1854, although he said that because of his business activities he had sought neither the nomination nor his election. ("My nomination to Congress alarmed me greatly, because I believed that it would result in my election.") He made a point of resigning his seat on the last day of the session. He then published a lengthy letter to his constituents explaining his frustrations in Congress and his decision not to run for a second term. He was well liked, even by Southern members, who found him "one of the best fellows in the Capitol, as one, although well known as an abolitionist, still as one to be tolerated".

By 1856, very little of the Liberty Party remained after most of its members joined the Free Soil Party in 1848 and nearly of all what remained of the party joined the Republicans in 1854. The small remnant of the party renominated Smith under the name of the "National Liberty Party".

In 1860, the remnant of the party was also called the Radical Abolitionists. A convention of one hundred delegates was held in Convention Hall, Syracuse, New York, on August 29, 1860. Delegates were in attendance from New York, Pennsylvania, New Jersey, Michigan, Illinois, Ohio, Kentucky, and Massachusetts. Several of the delegates were women. Smith, despite his poor health, fought William Goodell in regard to the nomination for the presidency. In the end, Smith was nominated for president and Samuel McFarland from Pennsylvania was nominated for vice president. The ticket won 171 popular votes from Illinois and Ohio. In Ohio, a slate of presidential electors pledged to Smith ran with the name of the Union Party.

Smith, along with his friend and ally Lysander Spooner, was a leading advocate of the United States Constitution as an antislavery document, as opposed to abolitionist William Lloyd Garrison, who believed it was to be condemned as a pro-slavery document, and was in favor of secession by the North. In 1852, Smith was elected to the United States House of Representatives as a Free-Soiler. In his address, he declared that all men have an equal right to the soil; that wars are brutal and unnecessary; that slavery could be sanctioned by no constitution, state or federal; that free trade is essential to human brotherhood; that women should have full political rights; that the Federal government and the states should prohibit the liquor traffic within their respective jurisdictions; and that government officers, so far as practicable, should be elected by direct vote of the people. Unhappy with his separation from his home and business, Smith resigned his seat at the end of the first session, ostensibly to allow voters sufficient time to select his successor.

In 1869, Smith served as a delegate to the founding convention of the Prohibition Party. During the 1872 presidential election Smith was considered for the Prohibition Party's presidential nomination.

Support for Blacks
According to Black Rev. Henry Highland Garnet, who moved there at Smith's invitation, "There are yet two places where slave holders cannot come—Heaven and Peterboro."

The failed land redistribution project (Timbuctoo)

After becoming an opponent of land monopoly, he gave numerous farms of  each to 1,000 "worthy" New York state Blacks. Abolitionist John Brown joined his project, purchasing land and moving his family there. However, the land Smith gave away was "of but moderate fertility", "heavily timbered, and in no respect remarkably inviting". In Smith's own words, it was his "poorest land"; his better land he sold. 

Most grantees never saw the remote land Smith had given them; many of those who did visit it soon left, and in 1857, it was estimated that less than 10% of the grantees were actually living on their land. The difficulty of farming in the mountains, coupled with the settlers' lack of experience in housebuilding and farming and the bigotry of white neighbors, caused the project to fail. As Smith put it, "I was perhaps a better land-reformer in theory than in practice." The John Brown Farm State Historic Site is all that remains of the settlement, called Timbuctoo, New York.

The Chapin slave escape
Peterboro became a station on the Underground Railroad. Due to his connections with it, Smith financially supported a planned mass slave escape in Washington, D.C., in April 1848, organized by William L. Chaplin, another abolitionist, as well as numerous members of the city's large free black community. The Pearl incident attracted widespread national attention after the 77 slaves were intercepted and captured about two days after they sailed from the capital.

Defending Fugitive Slave Law violators
Smith paid the legal expenses of several persons charged with infractions of the Fugitive Slave Law of 1850.

Helping John Brown in Kansas
Smith became a leading figure in the Kansas Aid Movement, a campaign to raise money and show solidarity with anti-slavery immigrants to that territory. It was during this movement that he first met and financially supported John Brown.

Harpers Ferry
Smith was a member of what much later was called the Secret Six, a informal group of influential Northern abolitionists, who supported Brown in his efforts to capture the armory at Harpers Ferry, Virginia (since 1863, West Virginia) and start a slave revolt. After the failed raid on Harpers Ferry, Senator Jefferson Davis unsuccessfully attempted to have Smith accused, tried, and hanged along with Brown. Governor Wise suggested that Smith be brought to him, "by fair or foul means", but residents of Peterboro said publicly that they would use guns to protect him. 

Upset by the raid, its outcome, and its aftermath, expecting to be indicted, Smith suffered a mental breakdown; he was described in the press as "a raving lunatic", who became "very violent". For several weeks he was confined to the Utica Psychiatric Center, at the time called the State Lunatic Asylum. He was accused of feigning his illness, but multiple reports state that it was genuine. He was initially on a suicide watch.

When the Chicago Tribune later claimed Smith had full knowledge of Brown's plan at Harper's Ferry, Smith sued the paper for libel, claiming that he lacked any such knowledge and thought only that Brown wanted guns so that slaves who ran away to join him might defend themselves against attackers. Smith's claim was countered by the Tribune, which produced an affidavit, signed by Brown's son, swearing that Smith had full knowledge of all the particulars of the plan, including the plan to instigate a slave uprising. In writing later of these events, Smith said, "That affair excited and shocked me, and a few weeks after I was taken to a lunatic asylum. From that day to this I have had but a hazy view of dear John Brown's great work. Indeed, some of my impressions of it have, as others have told me, been quite erroneous and even wild." Ralph Harlow concluded his examination of the episode with this quote from Brown: "G S he knew to be a timid man".

While in the New York Lunatic Asylum, today (2022) the Utica Psychiatric Center, he was treated with cannabis and morphine.

Other social activism
Smith was a major benefactor of New-York Central College, a co-educational and "racially" integrated college in Cortland County.

Smith supported the American Civil War, but at its close he advocated a mild policy toward the late Confederate states, declaring that part of the guilt of slavery lay upon the North. In 1867, Smith, together with Horace Greeley and Cornelius Vanderbilt, helped to underwrite the $100,000 bond needed to free Jefferson Davis, who had, at that time, been imprisoned for nearly two years without being charged with any crime. In doing this, Smith incurred the resentment of Northern Radical Republican leaders.

Smith's passions extended to religion as well as politics. Believing that sectarianism was sinful, he separated from the Presbyterian Church in 1843.  He was one of the founders of the Church at Peterboro, a non-denominational institution open to all non-slave-owning Christians.

His private benefactions were substantial; of his gifts he kept no record, but their value is said to have exceeded $8,000,000. Though a man of great wealth, his life was one of marked simplicity. He died in 1874 while visiting relatives in New York City.

The Gerrit Smith Estate, in Peterboro, New York, was declared a National Historic Landmark in 2001.

Tribute 
Frederick Douglass dedicated to Smith My Bondage and My Freedom (1855):

Years before, a student at his Peterboro Manual Labor School, where "Mr. Smith liberally supplies us with stationery, books, board and lodging", stated that "if the man of color has a sincere friend, that friend is Gerrit Smith".

Philanthropic activities 
Smith provided support for a large number of progressive causes and people and, except for his land grants, did not keep careful records. The dates given are in some cases approximate, either because documents do not provide a definite date, or because there were multiple payments.
 " of his land he had divided among various destitute people, and 650 poor women have received money from him to help provide themselves with homes."
 Built and ran unsuccessful temperance hotel in Peterboro, 1826–1831.
 Supporter of American Colonization Society, 1820s–early 1830s.
 Support for the Oneida Institute, 1830s.
 Manual labor school for "colored boys" in Peterboro, 1834-1836 (two years). Benjamin Quarles suggests that Smith may have ended the project  because it was duplicating what was available at the nearby Oneida Institute, headed by his friend Beriah Green.
 Founder of church in Peterboro, 1843. (Dissatisfied with existing churches' refusal to insist on abolition.)
 Supported Frederick Douglass' abolitionist newspaper, The North Star, late 1840s.
 Supported planned mass slave escape in Washington, DC, in April 1848, organized by William L. Chaplin.
 Provided land in North Elba, New York, to support Timbuctoo settlement of Black farmers, 1848.
 Sold land in North Elba to John Brown "for a bargain price of $1 an acre".
 Major benefactor of New-York Central College, 1850s.
 Helped with legal expenses of Fugitive Slave Law violators, 1850s.
 About 1855, gave $25,000 to build the Oswego City Library, and $5,000 for books.
 Leading figure in the New England Emigrant Aid Society (Kansas Aid Movement), assisting abolitionist settlers and John Brown working to make Kansas a free state, 1850s.
 Paid for printing of James Redpath's The Roving Editor: or, Talks with Slaves in the Southern States, 1859.
 One of Secret Six that helped finance John Brown's raid on Harper's Ferry, 1859
 One of guarantors of Jefferson Davis's bond, 1867.
 William G. Allen and family, in or near poverty in London, 1870s and 1880s.

After his death, a newspaper reported his philanthropic activities as follows:

Writings 
Smith paid for the printing of hundreds of broadsides, with his views on a variety of subjects. His own collection of his pamphlets is in the Syracuse University Library.  A number of recipients bound those they received into volumes, different contents for each collector. 

  Probably written by Smith. Includes (pp. 16–23) an "Extract from a letter by Gerrit Smith to Rev. Wm. H. Brisbane".

Archival material 
Smith's grandson, Gerrit Smith Miller, was the final resident of the Smith mansion. In 1928, before it burned, he donated Smith's enormous collection of letters, documents, diaries, and daybooks to the Syracuse University Library, along with a pamphlet and broadside collection of over 700 items. There is nothing like it for any other businessman of his day.
 Gerrit Smith Papers, Syracuse University Special Collections Research Center. 10,000 letters, 74 boxes. Library description of holdings: "Business, family and general correspondence; business and land records; writings; and maps. Notable correspondents include Susan B. Anthony, John Jacob Astor, Henry Ward Beecher, Antoinette Blackwell, Caleb Calkins, Lydia Maria Child, Cassius Clay, Alfred Conkling, Roscoe Conkling, Charles A. Dana, Paulina W. Davis, Edward C. Delavan, Frederick Douglass, Albert G. Finney, Sarah Grimké, Elizabeth Cady and Henry B. Stanton, Louis Tappan, Sojourner Truth, and Theodore Weld." The collection has been microfilmed, and together with materials of his father Peter Smith, fills 89 reels. A partial calendar of the general correspondence was published in 1941. The Special Collections Research Center of Syracuse University also holds Smith's pamphlet collection, "700+ items", which has also been microfilmed, and over half digitized and available online.
 Another important collection of documents related to Gerrit Smith is found in the archives of his alma mater, Hamilton College, in Clinton, Oneida County, New York.
 Additional documents are in the collections of the Peterboro and the Madison County Historical Societies.

See also 
 Fugitive Slave Convention
 Gerrit Smith Estate
 National Abolition Hall of Fame and Museum
 Peterboro Land Office
 Peterboro, New York

Relatives of Smith
 Ann Carroll Fitzhugh, wife
 Elizabeth Smith Miller, daughter
 Gerrit Smith Miller, grandson
 Gerrit Smith Miller Jr., great-grandson
 Greene Smith, son

References

Notes

Further reading (most recent first) 
 
 
 
 Wellman, Judith. The Road to Seneca Falls, University of Illinois Press, 2004. 
 
 
 
Frothingham, O. B., Gerrit Smith: a Biography (New York, 1879). .

External links

The Gerrit Smith Virtual Museum (New York History Net)
Gerrit Smith entry at The Political Graveyard

 NYHistory.com. Historic Peterboro
 

 

 

 
1797 births
1874 deaths
19th-century American politicians
Activists from New York (state)
American libertarians
Former Presbyterians
Free Soil Party members of the United States House of Representatives from New York (state)
Hamilton College (New York) alumni
Liberty Party (United States, 1840) presidential nominees
New York (state) Free Soilers
New York (state) Libertyites
New York (state) Republicans
Politicians from Utica, New York
People of New York (state) in the American Civil War
American social reformers
Underground Railroad people
American temperance activists
American colonization movement
American philanthropists
Secret Six
American suffragists
John Brown's raid on Harpers Ferry
Underground Railroad in New York (state)
Members of the United States House of Representatives from New York (state)
People from Peterboro, New York
Lake Placid, New York